GH One TV is a Ghana-based entertainment TV channel, whose content includes lifestyle, music, fashion, series, children's programs, comedy, and tourism. It is now owned by Excellence In Broadcasting (EIB) Networks, which has broadcaster Bola Ray, as its CEO. The station was formerly owned by Charter House Productions.
According to a survey conducted by GeoPoll, GH One is the 5th most watched TV station in Ghana. Nana Aba Anamoah is the current General Manager of the station

References

External links 
 

Ghanaian culture
Television stations in Ghana